Myron "Mike" Solberg (1930-July 28, 2001) was an American food scientist who was renowned for his collaboration with academia, government, and industry that better advanced food technology.

Education
A native of Massachusetts, Solberg earned his B.S. degree at the University of Massachusetts Amherst in 1952. He then went on to earn his Ph.D. at the Massachusetts Institute of Technology in 1960.
After earning his Ph.D., Solberg went to work in the meat industry before joining Rutgers University in 1964.

Research career
Joining the food science department at Rutgers University in 1964, Solberg worked in meat science and food microbiology. In 1984, he created the Center for Advanced Food Technology (CAFT), a cooperative research venture among academia, government, and industry in food science and technology. He would chair the CAFT until his 2000 retirement. This was also part of his work with the United States Department of Agriculture (USDA) Cooperative State Research, Education, and Extension Service (CSREES) for which he would be honored by them in 1997.

Memberships
American Association for the Advancement of Science - Fellow.
American Chemical Society - Fellow.
American Council on Science and Health
American Society for Microbiology
American Society for Quality
Institute of Food Technologists (IFT) - (Fellow: 1979, Nicholas Appert Award: 1990, Nominee for President: 1993, Carl R. Fellers Award: 2001)
New Jersey Academy of Science
New York Academy of Sciences

Military service
Solberg also served in the United States Air Force Reserves, rising to the rank of Lieutenant Colonel before he retired in 1991.

Death and legacy
Solberg died of cancer on July 28, 2001. In 2004, IFT created the Myron Solberg Award in honor of individuals who lead in establishing, successfully developing, and continuing a cooperative relationship among academia, government, and industry in food technology.

References
"In Memoriam: Myron (Mike) Solberg." Food Technology. September 2001: p. 16.

External links

3-year study on the enhancement of food stability authored by Solberg in 1996
March 2002 American Meat Science Association announcement of Solberg's death. p. 3 - Accessed October 26, 2006.
USDA awards in 1997
List of IFT Awards
List of IFT Fellows

1930 births
2001 deaths
American food scientists
Deaths from cancer
Fellows of the Institute of Food Technologists
Massachusetts Institute of Technology alumni
Rutgers University faculty
United States Air Force officers
University of Massachusetts Amherst alumni